Thomas Bridges (c. 1710 – 1775 or later) was an English writer of parodies, drama and one novel.  He was born in Hull, the son of a physician.  He became a wine merchant and a partner in a banking firm.

In 1762 he published, under the pseudonym Caustic Barebones, A Travestie of Homer, a parody or burlesque translation of Homer's Iliad.  The work achieved some popularity, and was reprinted several times, the last in 1797.  In 1765 he wrote The Battle of the Genii, a burlesque of John Milton's Paradise Lost, which was once attributed to Francis Grose.

Bridges' only novel was The Adventures of a Bank-Note, published in 1770.  He wrote two plays: Dido, a comic opera produced at the Haymarket Theatre in 1771, with music by James Hook; and The Dutchman (1775), a musical entertainment also with music by Hook.

References 
Oxford Dictionary of National Biography 

1710s births
Year of birth uncertain
Year of death unknown
18th-century English novelists
English satirists
English dramatists and playwrights
English male dramatists and playwrights
English male novelists
18th-century English male writers
18th-century English writers